Vladislav Mikhailovich Sysuyev (born 12 April 1989) is a Russian professional football player. He plays for FC Murom.

Club career
He made his Russian Football National League debut for FC Mordovia Saransk on 28 March 2007 in a game against FC Ural Yekaterinburg.

Personal life
His older brother Dmitri Sysuyev is also a footballer.

External links
 
 

1989 births
People from Saransk
Living people
Russian footballers
Association football midfielders
FC Mordovia Saransk players
FC Baltika Kaliningrad players
FC Rotor Volgograd players
FC Urozhay Krasnodar players
FC Inter Cherkessk players
FC Spartak Kostroma players
FC Tekstilshchik Ivanovo players
FC Chayka Peschanokopskoye players
Sportspeople from Mordovia